STS-86 was a Space Shuttle Atlantis mission to the Mir space station. This was the last Atlantis mission before it was taken out of service temporarily for maintenance and upgrades, including the glass cockpit.

Crew

Spacewalk
 Parazynski and Titov  – EVA 1
EVA 1 Start: 1 October 1997 – 17:29 UTC
EVA 1 End: 1 October 1997 – 22:30 UTC
Duration: 5 hours, 01 minutes

Mission highlights

The seventh Mir Docking mission carried a SPACEHAB double module for the docking with Mir, cargo transfer and an astronaut exchange. The shuttle's previous Mir missions were STS-71, STS-74, STS-76, STS-79, STS-81 and STS-84.

Highlights of the 10-day mission include five days of docked operations between Atlantis and Mir and the exchange of crew members Foale and Wolf to continue a permanent American presence of the Russia complex. A spacewalk is scheduled to retrieve the four Mir Environmental Effects Payloads which were attached to the Mir's docking module by Linda Godwin and Rich Clifford during STS-76 to characterize the environment surrounding the Mir space station. Atlantis will carry the SPACEHAB double module to support the transfer of logistics and supplies for Mir and the return of experiment hardware and specimens to Earth.

The seventh Mir docking mission continued the presence of a U.S. astronaut on the Russian space station with the transfer of physician David A. Wolf to Mir. Wolf became the sixth U.S. astronaut in succession to live on Mir to continue Phase 1B of the NASA/Russian Space Agency cooperative effort. However, the difficulties encountered by Foale and his predecessor aboard Mir, Jerry Linenger, had resulted in intense political pressure on NASA. The final decision between the termination of NASA crewing of Mir with Foale's departure, or his scheduled replacement by David Wolf was only made by NASA Administrator Daniel Goldin the night before the launch of STS-86.

Foale returned to Earth after spending 145 days in space, 134 of them aboard Mir. His estimated mileage logged was 58 million miles (93 million kilometers), making his the second longest U.S. space flight, behind Shannon Lucid's record of 188 days. His stay was marred by a collision on 25 June between a Progress resupply vehicle and the station's Spektr module, damaging a radiator and one of four solar arrays on Spektr. The mishap occurred while Mir 23 Commander Vasili Tsibliev was guiding the Progress capsule to a manual docking and depressurized the station. The crew sealed the hatch to the leaking Spektr module, leaving inside Foale's personal effects and several NASA science experiments, and repressurized the remaining modules.

An internal space walk by Tsibliev and Mir 23 Flight Engineer Aleksandr Lazutkin was planned to reconnect power cables to the three undamaged solar arrays, but during a routine medical exam 13 July Tsibliev was found to have an irregular heartbeat. Foale then began training for the space walk, but during one of the training exercises a power cable was inadvertently disconnected, leaving the station without power. On 21 July, it was announced that the internal space walk would not be conducted by the Mir 23 crew but their successors on Mir 24. On 30 July, NASA announced that Wendy Lawrence, originally assigned to succeed Foale on Mir, was being replaced by Wolf. The change was deemed necessary to allow Wolf to act as a backup crew member for the space walks planned over the next several months to repair Spektr. Unlike Wolf, Lawrence could not fit in the Orlan suit that is used for Russian space walks and she did not undergo space walk training.

Following their arrival at the station 7 August, Mir 24 Commander Anatoly Solovyev and Flight Engineer Pavel Vinogradov conducted the internal space walk inside the depressurized Spektr module 22 August, reconnecting 11 power cables from the Spektr's solar arrays to a new custom-made hatch for the Spektr. During the space walk, Foale remained inside the Soyuz capsule attached to Mir, in constant communication with the cosmonauts as well as ground controllers.

On 5 September, Foale and Solovyev conducted a six-hour external extravehicular activity to survey damage outside Spektr and to try to pinpoint where the breach of the module's hull occurred. Two undamaged arrays were manually repositioned to better gather solar energy, and a radiation device left previously by Jerry Linenger was retrieved.

The docking of Atlantis and Mir took place at 3:58 pm EDT, 27 September, with the two mission commanders opening the spacecraft hatches at 5:45 pm Wolf officially joined the Mir 24 at noon EDT, 28 September. At the same time, Foale became a member of the STS-86 crew and began moving his personal belongings back into Atlantis. Wolf will be replaced by the seventh and last U.S. astronaut to transfer to Mir, Andrew S. W. Thomas, when the orbiter Endeavour docks with the Russian space station during the STS-89 mission in January 1998.

First joint U.S.-Russian extravehicular activity during a Shuttle mission, which was also the 39th in the Space Shuttle program, was conducted by Titov and Parazynski. During the five-hour, one-minute space walk on 1 October, the pair affixed a 121-pound Solar Array Cap to the docking module for future use by Mir crew members to seal off the suspected leak in Spektr's hull. Parazynski and Titov also retrieved four Mir Environmental Effects Payloads (MEEPS) from the outside of Mir and tested several components of the Simplified Aid for EVA Rescue (SAFER) jet packs. The space walk began at 1:29 pm EDT and ended at 6:30 pm

The new motion control computer replaced one that had experienced problems in recent months. The crew also moved experiment samples and hardware and an old Elektron oxygen generator to Atlantis for return to Earth. Undocking took place at 1:28 pm EDT, 3 October. After undocking, Atlantis performed a 46-minute flyaround visual inspection of Mir. During this maneuver, Solovyev and Vinogradov opened a pressure regulation valve to allow air into the Spektr module to see if STS-89 crew members could detect seepage or debris particles that could indicate the location of the breach in the damaged module's hull.

During the flight, Wetherbee and Bloomfield fired small jet thrusters on Atlantis to provide data for the Mir Structural Dynamics Experiment (MISDE), which measures disturbances to space station components and its solar arrays. Other experiments conducted during the mission were the Commercial Protein Crystal Growth investigation; the Cell Culture Module Experiment (CCM-A), the Cosmic Radiation Effects and Activation Monitor (CREAM) and the Radiation Monitoring Experiment-III (RME-III); the Shuttle Ionospheric Modification with Pulsed Local Exhaust (SIMPLE) experiment; and the Midcourse Space Experiment. Two NASA educational outreach programs were also conducted, Seeds in Space-II and KidSat.

See also

List of human spaceflights
List of Space Shuttle missions
Outline of space science
Space Shuttle

External links

 NASA mission summary 
 STS-86 Video Highlights 

Spacecraft launched in 1997
Space Shuttle missions